Panamericana is a 2010 documentary about a road-trip from Mexico to Argentina through 12 countries and for 13,000 kilometers.

Plot 

The film tells stories of lives on and around the Pan-American Highway. The journey begins in Laredo (USA) and continues through Central and South America to Buenos Aires (Argentina).

Soundtrack 

Panamericanas soundtrack score was created by El Siete.

The track listing for the original CD is as follows:

 "Via Panam" (Title Track) (04:14) – performed by El Siete feat. Delinquent Habits
 "Amor" (03:22) – performed by Manu Vazquez
 "Llama a la Chota" (03:44) – performed by El Elote
 "Valparaíso" (Live) (03:24) – performed by Jorge Medina
 "Desilusión" (04:45) – performed by Jayac
 "Nuestro Juramento" (03:19) – performed by Joaquin Cabrera
 "Difunta Correa" (Live) (02:54) – performed by Francesca
 "Camino a Guanajuato" (03:06) – performed by Joaquin Cabrera
 "No te Olvides" (04:29) – performed by Jayac
 "Beat Andino" (02:31) – performed by Andino
 "Adoro" (Live) (02:52) – performed by Jorge Medina
 "Creo" (03:14) – performed by Joaquin Cabrera
 "Bienvenido" (04:43) – performed by Corina feat. El Siete
 "Historia" (Live) (02:58) – performed by Jorge Medina
 "Que bonita es esta vida" (02:47) – performed by Joaquin Cabrera
 "Destino cruel" (06:18) – performed by Jayac
 "Animitas" (03:31) – performed by Francesca feat. El Siete
 "Te fuiste" (03:48) – performed by Jayac
 "Guapa y linda" (02:51) – performed by Manu Vazquez
 "Guantanamera" (04:34) – performed by Puerto Cuba
 "Marimba" (Live) (02:57) – performed by Banda en vivo

External links 

 
 Distribution Company
 

2010 films
Swiss documentary films
2010s Spanish-language films
2010 documentary films
Pan-American Highway
Documentary films about Latin America
Documentary films about road transport